Gabrielle Colonna-Romano (January 17 1888 – February 2 1981) or Colanna Romano (name as a cinema actress), born Gabrielle Dreyfus, was a French actress, famous as a tragedian, sociétaire of the Comédie-Française from 1913 to 1936, and as a student of Sarah Bernhardt.  She appeared in several plays and poetry readings (notably of works by the Symbolist poet Saint-Pol-Roux).  She had an affair with Pierre Renoir, and modelled for several paintings by his father Auguste Renoir, notably Jeune femme à la rose (1913).  In England, she met and became friends with Marie Bell, on whose advice she decided to present herself to the Conservatoire.

She was the sixth and final wife of the millionaire press-magnate Alfred Edwards, and after his death married the actor Pierre Alcover.  She and Alcover are buried together in the Rueil-Malmaison cemetery.

She gives her name to the "Prix Colonna-Romano de tragédie classique" at the Conservatoire national supérieur d'art dramatique in Paris.

Filmography 
 1908 : Hamlet, directed by Henri Desfontaines (Gertrude)	
 1910 : Le Scarabée d'or, directed by Henri Desfontaines
 1910 : Hop-Frog, directed by Henri Desfontaines
 1911 : Le Roman de la momie (film), directed by Henri Desfontaines
 1912 : Antar, directed by Chékri Ganem
 1913 : L'Honneur, directed by Henri Pouctal

Sources 
This page is a translation of its French counterpart.

1888 births
1981 deaths
French stage actresses
French film actresses
French silent film actresses
Sociétaires of the Comédie-Française
20th-century French actresses